The Larco Museum (officially known as Rafael Larco Herrera Archaeological Museum, in ) is a privately owned museum of pre-Columbian art, located in the Pueblo Libre District of Lima, Peru. The museum is housed in an 18th-century vice-royal building. It showcases chronological galleries that provide a thorough overview of 5,000 years of Peruvian pre-Columbian history. It is well known for its gallery of pre-Columbian erotic pottery.

History

In 1925, Rafael Larco Herrera acquired a collection of vases and other archaeological pieces from his brother-in-law, Alfredo Hoyle. There were approximately 600 ceramic pieces in all. The arrival of these objects ignited a collector's enthusiasm in his son, Rafael Larco Hoyle. Soon after, Larco Herrera left his son in charge of the collection and those pieces completed the first collection of what would become the Rafael Larco Herrera Museum.

During that same year, Larco Hoyle received some advice from his uncle, Victor Larco Herrera, a founder of the first museum in Lima. He urged Larco Hoyle to form a new museum in Lima, one that could guard all the archaeological relics that were continually being extracted by clandestine excavators.

Larco Hoyle agreed with his uncle and proceeded to create a museum that would carry on his father's legacy. Larco Hoyle purchased two large collections: 8,000 pieces from Roa and 6,000 pieces from Carranza. He also purchased several small collections in Chicama Valley, Trujillo, Virú, and Chimbote. Within a year, the collection had grown significantly and display cases were installed in a small house on the Chiclín estate. On July 28, 1926, Independence Day, the museum opened to the public as Museo Arqueológico Rafael Larco Herrera.

The Larco Museum now lends some of its collection to its daughter museum, the Museo de Arte Precolombino (Pre-Columbian Art Museum), located in Cusco, Peru.

Exhibitions

Permanent exhibits

The Museum has several permanent exhibitions. The Gold and Silver Gallery showcases the largest collection of jewelry used by many notable rulers of pre-Columbian Peru. It comprises a collection of crowns, earrings, nose ornaments, garments, masks and vases, finely wrought in gold and decorated with semi-precious stones. Ancient Peruvian cultures represented their daily lives in ceramics, and this gallery holds the world's largest collection of erotic ceramics.

The Cultures Gallery exhibits 10,000 years of Peruvian pre-Columbian history. This chronology-based gallery provides visitors with a comprehensive view of cultures that existed in pre-Columbian Peru through the extant indigenous art that has survived since the 16th century Spanish conquest. This hall is divided into four areas: North Coast, Center, South and cultures from the highlands. Showcases have been ordered according to cultural sequence:

 From the North Coast:  Cupisnique, Vicus, Mochica and Chimu;
 From the Central Coast:  Lima and Chancay;
 From the South Coast: Paracas, Nazca and Chincha;
 From the Highlands: Chavín, Tiahuanaco, Huari and Inca.

Other galleries include the Lithic, Vault, Ceramics, Metals, Textiles and Storage in which visitors have the opportunity to view the Museum's entire collection of classified archaeological objects.

International exhibits
In addition to its permanent exhibits, the Larco Museum lends its collections to several museums and cultural centers around the world.

Gallery of pre-Columbian Erotic Pottery

This hall displays the selection of archaeological objects found by Rafael Larco Hoyle in the 1960s, as a result of his research on sexual representations in Peruvian pre-Columbian art, published in his book, "Checan" (1966).

Other points of interest
The Museum Gallery Shop has a wide variety of ceramic, metal and textile reproductions made by skilled craftsmen from all over Peru. The museum has formalized the reproduction techniques for these pre-Columbian artifacts and assesses each piece to ensure quality.

Gallery

References
 Berrin, Katherine & Larco Museum. The Spirit of Ancient Peru: Treasures from the Museo Arqueológico Rafael Larco Herrera. New York: Thames and Hudson, 1997.

External links
 Larco Museum Homepage
  Los Mochicas
 http://cafe.museolarco.org/
Virtual tour of the Larco Museum provided by Google Arts & Culture

Museums in Lima
Museums in Peru
History museums
Archaeological museums in Peru
Pre-Columbian art museums
1926 establishments in Peru
Art museums established in 1926